Meeker is a town in Lincoln County, Oklahoma, United States. The population was 1,145 at the 2010 census.

Geography
Meeker is located at  (35.497295, -96.897114).

Demographics

As of the census of 2000, there were 978 people, 409 households, and 269 families residing in the town. There were 478 housing units at an average density of 151.1 per square mile (58.4/km2). The racial makeup of the town was 84.56% White, 0.72% African American, 9.82% Native American, 0.20% Asian, 0.20% from other races, and 4.50% from two or more races. Hispanic or Latino of any race were 1.33% of the population.

There were 409 households, out of which 35.2% had children under the age of 18 living with them, 48.7% were married couples living together, 14.4% had a female householder with no husband present, and 34.0% were non-families. 30.8% of all households were made up of individuals, and 15.2% had someone living alone who was 65 years of age or older. The average household size was 2.39 and the average family size was 3.02.

In the town, the age distribution of the population shows 30.0% under the age of 18, 7.9% from 18 to 24, 25.7% from 25 to 44, 21.6% from 45 to 64, and 14.9% who were 65 years of age or older. The median age was 36 years. For every 100 females, there were 83.5 males. For every 100 females age 18 and over, there were 77.9 males.

The median income for a household in the town was $25,313, and the median income for a family was $34,659. Males had a median income of $31,146 versus $21,500 for females. The per capita income for the town was $13,344. About 16.1% of families and 19.1% of the population were below the poverty line, including 28.1% of those under age 18 and 6.8% of those age 65 or over.

Home of Carl Hubbell 
Carl Hubbell, American baseball player and Hall of Famer, was raised in Meeker. Hubbell was born in the rural community of Red Oak, near Carthage, Missouri, and moved to Meeker at the age of four. Nicknamed "King Carl" by the fans and "The Meal Ticket" by his teammates, Hubbell's first major-league victory was a 4–0 shutout of the Philadelphia Phillies. Making a late entry to the majors at age 25, Hubbell would go 10–6 in his first season, and would pitch his entire 16-year major league career for the New York Giants.

With a slow delivery of his devastating screwball, Hubbell recorded five consecutive 20-win seasons for the Giants (1933–37), and helped his team to three NL pennants and the 1933 World Series title. In the 1933 Series, he won two complete game victories, including an 11-inning 2–1 triumph in Game Four (the run was unearned). In six career Series starts, he was 4–2 with 32 strikeouts and a 1.79 earned run average, and is still remembered for striking out Babe Ruth, Lou Gehrig, Jimmie Foxx, Al Simmons and Joe Cronin in their consecutive at-bats in the 1934 All-Star Game.

Hubbell was elected to the Baseball Hall of Fame in Cooperstown, New York, in 1947. Cubs second baseman Billy Herman, a fellow Hall-of-Famer, once said of him that "He could throw strikes at midnight."

Meeker City Hall has a museum dedicated to Carl Hubbell, who is buried in the town's New Hope Cemetery in a grave with a simple headstone. As part of the town's 100th anniversary celebration in 2003, Main Street (aka U.S. Highway 62) was renamed Carl Hubbell Boulevard.

NRHP sites

The following sites in Meeker are listed on the National Register of Historic Places:

Crescent School
Fairview School
Hendley Manor
Meeker Town Hall
Spring Dell School
St. Paul Baptist Church and Cemetery

References

External links

Oklahoma City metropolitan area
Towns in Lincoln County, Oklahoma
Towns in Oklahoma